Maria Stenberg (born 7 July 1966) is a Swedish social democratic politician. She has been a member of the Riksdag between 2002 and 2014.

External links
 Maria Stenberg at the Riksdag website

Living people
1966 births
Women members of the Riksdag
Members of the Riksdag 2002–2006
21st-century Swedish women politicians
Members of the Riksdag from the Social Democrats
Members of the Riksdag 2006–2010
Members of the Riksdag 2010–2014